The Bishkent culture or Beshkent culture is a late Bronze Age archaeological culture of southern Tajikistan, dating to c. 1700 – 1500 BC. It is primarily known from its cemeteries, which appear to have been used by mobile pastoralists.

The Bishkent culture has been seen as a possible contributor to the Swat culture, which in turn is often associated with early Indo-Aryan movements into northwest India.

See also

 Vakhsh culture
 Chust culture
 Yaz culture

Sources
 

Archaeological cultures of South Asia
Bronze Age cultures of Asia
Indo-Aryan archaeological cultures
Iron Age cultures of Asia
Archaeological cultures in Tajikistan